Simona Renata Baldassarre (born 12 November 1970 in Giurdignano) is an Italian politician who was elected as a member of the European Parliament in 2019.

References

1970 births
Living people
MEPs for Italy 2019–2024
21st-century women MEPs for Italy
Lega Nord MEPs